= Pallav Vora =

Indian cricketer (born 1981)

Personal information
- Full name: Pallav Prakashchandra Vora
- Born: 24 January 1981 (age 45); Ahmedabad, Gujarat
- Batting: Right-handed
- Role: Wicket-keeper

Domestic team information
- Years: Team
- 2001–2006: Gujarat
- 2007/08: Ahmedabad Rockets
- Source: ESPNcricinfo, 18 May 2016

Pallav Prakashchandra Vora (born 24 January 1981) is an Indian cricketer who plays for Gujarat as well as Ahmedabad Rockets. He is a right-handed wicket-keeper batsman who was born at Ahmedabad.
